A dishcloth or dishrag is used in the kitchen to clean or dry dishes and surfaces. Dishcloths are typically made of cotton or other fibres, such as microfiber, and measure 11" to 13" inches square. Dishcloths used for drying dishes are also known as tea towels.

Microwave disinfection 
Dishcloths are often left damp and provide a breeding ground for bacteria. Since the kitchen sink is used to clean food, dishcloths are routinely infected with E. coli and salmonella. In 2007 a study from the Journal of Environmental Health found that putting a damp dishcloth (or sponge) in the microwave for 2 minutes killed 99% of living pathogens. However, fire departments have subsequently warned people not to do this as it can be a fire hazard, especially if the dishcloth or sponge is not sufficiently wet. Several small fires have been started as a result of people following the advice from the study.

References 

Kitchen
Linens
Domestic implements